Chung Pui-lam, GBS, SBS, OBE, JP (born 11 October 1940 in Hong Kong) was the member of the Legislative Council of Hong Kong and Sham Shui Po District Board.

He became a Hong Kong government civil servant as his early career and later on studied law at the University of London and University of Hong Kong. He set up the Chung & Kwan Solicitors law firm, after he left the legal department in the Hong Kong government in 1979.

He was first elected as the Sham Shui Po District Board member in 1985 in the Lai Wan constituency based in the Mei Foo Sun Chuen and reelected in 1988. He was elected in the first Legislative Council indirect election from the Sham Shui Po electoral college constituency consisting of members of the Eastern and Sham Shui Po District Board and served until 1991.

In the Legislative Council meeting held on 27 June 1990 on the debate of the Hong Kong Bill of Rights Ordinance, Chung conceded the equality between men and women was a basic human right but thought that to extend the right to the New Territories women to inherit land the same as men would lead to social disorder and the instability of Hong Kong.

References

1940 births
Living people
District councillors of Sham Shui Po District
Recipients of the Gold Bauhinia Star
Recipients of the Silver Bauhinia Star
Officers of the Order of the British Empire
Alumni of the University of Hong Kong
Alumni of the University of London
Progressive Hong Kong Society politicians
Liberal Democratic Federation of Hong Kong politicians
Hong Kong Progressive Alliance politicians
Solicitors of Hong Kong
Hong Kong civil servants
HK LegCo Members 1985–1988
HK LegCo Members 1988–1991